Timothy David Key (born September 1976) is an English poet, comedian, actor, screenwriter and radio personality. He is best known for playing Alan Partridge's sidekick Simon in Mid Morning Matters, Alpha Papa, and This Time, as well as his work as a member of the comedy group Cowards and his extensive list of performances at the Edinburgh Fringe Festival. In 2009, he won the Edinburgh Comedy Award and was nominated for the Malcolm Hardee Award for Comic Originality.

Early life
Timothy David Key was born on 10 September 1976, in Cambridgeshire. He was educated in the intertwined villages of Histon and Impington before moving on to Hills Road Sixth Form College in Cambridge and then the University of Sheffield, where he studied Russian. Following graduation, he returned to Cambridge and joined the Cambridge Footlights, despite not being a student of Cambridge University. There he met Tom Basden, Stefan Golaszewski, and Lloyd Woolf, with whom he formed the sketch group Cowards.

Career

Stage 
Key's first appearance with the Footlights was in the stage production Far Too Happy in 2001. The cast, which included Mark Watson and Sophie Winkleman, took the show to the Edinburgh Festival Fringe and were nominated for the Edinburgh Comedy Award for Best Newcomer. Key has regularly attended Edinburgh ever since, performing in solo shows and collaborations.

In 2009, Key's solo poetry show The Slutcracker won the Edinburgh Comedy Award and was nominated for the Malcolm Hardee Award for Comic Originality. He took the show to the Melbourne International Comedy Festival the following year.

Key co-starred in Daniel Kitson's play Tree when it premiered in September 2013 at the Royal Exchange, Manchester. The play then transferred to The Old Vic in 2015. He appeared alongside Paul Ritter and Rufus Sewell in Yasmina Reza's Art at The Old Vic, directed by Matthew Warchus, from December 2016 to February 2017.

Key's comedy show Megadate toured from 2017 to 2018. Like The Slutcracker, it featured Key reading "deliberately bad" poetry interspersed with black-and-white films.

Radio 
Key has regularly been heard on BBC Radio 4 since 2006, when the station commissioned All Bar Luke, a series based on his earlier stage show Luke & Stella. It aired from 2006 to 2008, with a Christmas special in 2009. Key's prior radio projects included Cowards and Mark Watson Makes the World Substantially Better.

In 2010, Key was heard as Duncan in the radio sitcom Party, created by Tom Basden and based on the stage show of the same name. In 2012, he reunited with Basden for Tim Key's Late Night Poetry Programme, a series that features Key reading poetry and Basden providing musical accompaniment, intercut with dialogue between the two. Five series of the show have been broadcast as of 2020.

Album 
Key's first album, Tim Key. With a String Quartet. On a Boat. was released by The Invisible Dot Ltd / Angular Records in November 2010. It features Key reading poetry backed by a string quartet, with interjections from Basden.

Television 
Key first appeared on television in 2006's satirical comedy Time Trumpet, as an Eastenders special effects supervisor. The next year, he appeared as himself in Charlie Brooker's Screenwipe, reading poetry.

In 2009, Key (along with Mark Watson and Alex Horne) co-created We Need Answers for BBC Four, a comedic quiz show in which celebrities answer questions posed by question-answering text services. It was hosted by Watson, with Horne providing technical support and Key reading questions. As part of the show's bonus online content, the BBC uploaded videos of Key and Watson playing No More Women, a parlour game they had invented several years earlier, with Horne supplying narration. The three reunited in 2020 to play the game as a trio, renaming it No More Jockeys.

In November 2010, Key appeared as "Sidekick Simon" alongside Steve Coogan on Mid Morning Matters, an online series based on Coogan's Alan Partridge character. The series was also broadcast on Sky Atlantic in 2012. Key would appear again as Simon in the 2013 film Alan Partridge: Alpha Papa and the BBC series This Time with Alan Partridge.

In 2013, Key played Greg in the E4 comedy-drama series Gap Year. In 2014, he played Ian in the Inside No. 9 episode "Sardines". His performance was praised, with one journalist calling him "an unsung hero of British comedy". The following year, he was a panellist on the first series of Taskmaster and has been credited as a "Task Consultant" since the show's second series.

Key has also had minor roles in shows such as Skins, Plebs,  Life's Too Short, Stag, Peep Show, Brassic (TV Series) and The End of the F***ing World. He has also appeared on panel shows Never Mind the Buzzcocks and Richard Osman's House of Games.

In 2022, Key starred in the BBC Two comedy series The Witchfinder. That year he also appeared as Ray, nemesis and old archery teammate of Paul (Jim Howick) in an episode of friend Tom Basden's BBC1 sitcom, Here We Go.

Film 
Key and Basden collaborated on short film The One and Only Herb McGwyer Plays Wallis Island in 2007. The film won Best UK Short at the 2007 Edinburgh Film Festival and was nominated for a 2008 BAFTA in the category of Best Short Film. In 2012, Key collaborated with director J. van Tulleken on one of 16 short films to have won production funding through BFI Shorts. The resultant film was a black comedy entitled Anthony, starring Key and Basden, in which Key played Santa Claus

Key reprised his role as Sidekick Simon for the Alan Partridge film Alpha Papa, released in August 2013. Also in 2013, he appeared in the Richard Ayoade film The Double. In 2019, he again starred alongside Steve Coogan in Greed, playing the character of Sam. In 2022, he played  Commissioner Harrold Scott in See How They Run.

Writing 
Key has written a total of five books. The first, Instructions, Guidelines, Tutelage, Suggestions, Other Suggestions and Examples Etc.: An Attempted Book by Tim Key. (And Conversations / Descriptions / A Piece About a Moth), was published in 2009. The second, 25 Poems, 3 Recipes and 32 Other Suggestions (An Inventory) was published in 2011. The third, The Incomplete Tim Key, was published by Canongate Books in 2011.

In 2020, Key collaborated with designer Emily Juniper to create He Used Thought As a Wife (An Anthology of Poems and Conversations from Inside). This book, published by Utter and Press, chronicles Key's experiences during the UK's first COVID-19 lockdown. A sequel, Here We Go Round the Mulberry Bush (An Anthology of Poems and Conversations from Outside), was released in 2022.

Credits

Film

Television

Bibliography 
 Instructions, Guidelines, Tutelage, Suggestions, Other Suggestions and Examples Etc.: An Attempted Book By Tim Key. (And Conversations/ Descriptions/ A Piece About A Moth). The Invisible Dot Ltd, 2009. 
The Incomplete Tim Key. Canongate Books Ltd, 2011. 
 25 Poems, 3 Recipes and 32 Other Suggestions (An Inventory). The Invisible Dot Ltd, 2011. 
 He Used Thought As A Wife (An Anthology of Poems and Conversations from Inside.) "Utter" and Press, 2020.
 Here We Go Round The Mulberry Bush (An Anthology of Poems and Conversations from Outside.) "Utter" and Press, 2022.

References

External links 

1976 births
Living people
Alumni of the University of Sheffield
English comedy writers
English stand-up comedians
English male poets
Male actors from Cambridgeshire
People from Cambridgeshire